Aligue fried rice, also known as crab fat fried rice or aligue rice, is a Filipino fried rice dish cooked by stir-frying pre-cooked rice with crab fat (taba ng talangka or aligue), toasted garlic, spring onions, black pepper, rock salt, and optionally butter. It is traditionally a vivid orange-yellow color due to the crab fat. It can be combined with seafood like shrimp and squid and eaten as is, or eaten paired with meat dishes.

It is a variant of sinangag (garlic fried rice) and is similar to bagoong fried rice, which uses bagoong (shrimp paste).

See also
 Sinangag
 Fried rice
 Kiampong
 Kuning
 Sinigapuna

References

Fried rice
Philippine rice dishes